Richard "Rick" Sebak (born June 5, 1953) is an American public broadcasting television producer, writer and narrator who lives and works in Pittsburgh, Pennsylvania in the United States.

Early life and education 
Richard Sebak was born on June 5, 1953, in Bethel Park, Pennsylvania. He attended Bethel Park High School and the University of North Carolina at Chapel Hill, where he was a Phi Beta Kappa graduate.

Career 
Sebak's first foray in the nostalgia documentary is the 1984 documentary Shag for South Carolina ETV, about a dance popular in the region. Four years later at WQED, Sebak produced The Mon, The Al & The O, about the Monongahela, Allegheny, and Ohio rivers, which meet to form at Pittsburgh's Golden Triangle; and Kennywood Memories, about Kennywood, a historic local amusement park.

As of March 2006, 313,227 copies of Sebak's films had been sold or given away as pledge gifts by public television stations nationwide, which WQED credits with largely helping it become financially solvent. Sebak's scrapbook documentary format has been copied by other stations, many of whom see record pledge drive numbers when their documentaries air at pledge time.

For his 25th year at the station, WQED produced a program called What Makes Rick Tick. Special photos of Sebak to celebrate this 25th anniversary were added to Yinztagram.  The City of Pittsburgh declared the 1st week of December "Rick Sebak Week."

Starting in 2018 the Rick Sebak specials for WQED have been shortened to 30 minutes and put under the umbrella title "NEBBY: RICK SEBAK'S TALES OF GREATER PITTSBURGH". Nebby is a Pittsburghese term meaning "nosy." Sebak fell and seriously injured his leg in 2018, and his special "Nebby: My Seven Weeks in Magee" showed his recovery and the support (and food) he received from many Pittsburghers. Due to Rick's injury, 3 of the 8 episodes re-used 20 year old footage from older, out of circulation, documentaries with updates.

Sebak is the creator of the "scrapbook documentary" genre, many of which he has created for WQED and PBS. This scrapbook style incorporates many old films, home movies, postcards, old photos and memorabilia of all sorts. Rick does not appear on-camera in these programs, but audiences have learned to recognize his voice and distinctive narrative style.

His work is supported by the Buhl Foundation.

Filmography

Home video
 The PITTSBURGH HISTORY SERIES (WQED Multi-media)- From the start, 1988, as each new documentary was produced VHS tapes were made as "Thank You" gifts for WQED supporters and sold at specialty stores throughout Pittsburgh.  In 2002 releases switched over to the new popular DVD format.  WQED re-issued all but two of the VHS shows onto DVD with new bonus material under the "WQED Classics" banner. "The Mon, The Al & The O" got combined with "Flying Off The Bridge to Nowhere..." for their DVD re-issue. "Holy Pittsburgh" never got re-issued.  "Our Neighbor Fred Rogers'(1989) was updated and re-titled to "Fred Rogers, America's Favorite Neighbor"(2003) for the DVD release.  VHS tapes were sold as long as stock remained, but no new dubs were made.  NONE of these documentaries were made available for video streaming.
 The ALL-AMERICAN SERIES (PBS Home Video) – 1996 to 2002 Documentaries were sold on VHS Tape. 2003 PBS Home Video switched over to DVD.  The VHS documentaries were re-issued on DVD with bonus material, later the first four were collected as one set.  To date, July 2021, all of the PBS Home Video DVDs are still available, although their website indicates less than 10 copies of each title is in stock. NONE of these documentaries are currently available for video streaming.
 NEBBY: RICK SEBAK'S TALES OF GREATER PITTSBURGH – 2018 & 2019 After their broadcast these Half Hour Documentaries were posted on both WQED and PBS websites for video streaming.

References

External links

1953 births
Living people
University of North Carolina at Chapel Hill alumni
People from Bethel Park, Pennsylvania
American documentary film directors
American documentary film producers
Film directors from Pennsylvania
Film producers from Pennsylvania
Pennsylvania Democrats